William Watkin (fl. 1592–1597) of Wells, Somerset, was an English politician.

Watkin was Mayor of Wells in 1592. He was a Member (MP) of the Parliament of England for Wells in 1597.

References

16th-century births
Year of death missing
Mayors of Wells, Somerset
English MPs 1597–1598